Panayam  is a village in Kollam district in the state of Kerala, India.

Demographics
 India census, Panayam had a population of 24397 with 11843 males and 12554 females.

References

Villages in Kollam district